The Principality of Outer Baldonia is a defunct micronation that claimed sovereignty over approximately  of Outer Bald Tusket Island, the southernmost of the Tusket Islands off the southern tip of the Canadian province of Nova Scotia.

Founded in 1949 by American businessman Russell Arundel, the principality had a charter, a flag, passports, and an organized military. All citizens of the principality who caught a Bluefin tuna and paid a $50 fee were accorded the rank of prince. Its government officials included Prince of Princes Russell Arundel, Chancellor Elson Boudreau, and Ambassador Extraordinary and Minister Plenipotentiary Ron Wallace. The text of the Charter of Outer Baldonia is preserved in the Yarmouth County Museum.

After the Soviet state publication Literaturnaya Gazeta published a critique of the charter of Outer Baldonia, Outer Baldonia declared war on the Soviet Union on March 9, 1953. The Soviets issued a series of condemnations through their various press outlets, and press coverage exposed the principality as a humorous half-truth.

In 1973, Outer Bald Tusket Island was sold by Russell Arundel for the price of one Canadian dollar to the Nova Scotia Bird Society. The island has been designated the Earle E. Arundel Breeding Bird Sanctuary.

References 

Outer Baldonia
Outer Baldonia
Outer Baldonia
History of Nova Scotia by location
Yarmouth County
Former unrecognized countries
Micronations